Chykie Jerrod Brown (born December 26, 1986) is a former American football cornerback. He was drafted by the Baltimore Ravens in the fifth round of the 2011 NFL draft. He played college football for the University of Texas at Austin.

Early years
He was named as an all-state high school standout in which included playing multiple positions safety, cornerback, running back and wide receiver in high school. He was a two-time all-district athlete where he earned three letters. He was selected to the first-team 5A all-state by The Associated Press and Texas Sports Writers Association in his Senior season in high school. He also was selected to the first-team all-district team. He finished high school with a total of 120 tackles, 10 interceptions, and 4 forced fumbles. Brown is a 2006 graduate of  North Shore High School, where he was an honor roll student.

College career
Brown played college football for head coach Mack Brown at the University of Texas in Austin, Texas. He  red-shirted as a freshman. In four seasons as a player he appeared in 47 career games, starting 29. College career stats include 106 tackles (71 solo), two INTs, four QB sacks, and two forced fumbles.

Professional career

Baltimore Ravens
Brown was selected in the 5th round (164 overall) in the 2011 NFL Draft by the Baltimore Ravens.

In the 2011 season, Brown saw very little playing time and ended the year with seven total tackles and one pass defensed.

Brown saw slightly more playing time in the 2012 season due to season-ending ACL injury to Lardarius Webb, ending the regular season with 25 total tackles and 5 passes defensed. In the first quarter of the AFC Divisional playoff game against the top-seeded Denver Broncos, Brown broke up a Peyton Manning pass intended for Eric Decker that Corey Graham returned for a touchdown. The Ravens went on to win the game 38-35 in double overtime and defeated the  San Francisco 49ers in Super Bowl XLVII three weeks later, earning Brown his first Super Bowl ring.

In the 2013 season, Brown mostly played on special teams and ended the year with ten tackles. He was released on November 4, 2014.

New York Giants
Brown was signed off waivers by the New York Giants on November 5, 2014. On September 5, 2015, he was cut by the Giants.

Cincinnati Bengals
On February 8, 2016, Brown signed a future contract with the Cincinnati Bengals. On September 3, 2016, he was released by the Bengals but was re-signed the next day. He was placed on injured reserve on November 28, 2016 after being carted off with a knee injury in Week 12.

References

External links
 Baltimore Ravens bio
 New York Giants bio
 Chykie Brown at Pro Football Reference

1986 births
Living people
North Shore Senior High School (Texas) alumni
Players of American football from Houston
American football cornerbacks
Texas Longhorns football players
Baltimore Ravens players
New York Giants players
Cincinnati Bengals players